The 1983 Tour du Haut Var was the 15th edition of the Tour du Haut Var cycle race and was held on 27 February 1983. The race started in Nice and finished in Seillans. The race was won by Joop Zoetemelk.

General classification

References

1983
1983 in road cycling
1983 in French sport
February 1983 sports events in Europe